Manuel Carrasco Galloso (born January 15, 1981) is a Spanish pop singer from Isla Cristina (Huelva), Spain. He rose to fame during his participation in the second edition of the reality talent competition Operación Triunfo, where he finished second. He has gone on to record four studio albums, including his debut album, Quiéreme, which sold more than 200,000 records.

Early life 
Manuel Carrasco was born on January 15, 1981, in Isla Cristina, a seaside town in Huelva, Spain. Son of José Carrasco and María Galloso, he is the fourth of five siblings. From a very young age, he worked as a painter with his brothers, while he rehearsed and performed with a carnival group from his town. He joined the group when he was 13 and led it at age 16.

Operación Triunfo 
At 30, he tried out for the second edition of the Spanish interactive reality TV show Operación Triunfo (Spain's version of Fame Academy or Star Academy) where he finished second. The winner of that edition of OT was Ainhoa Cantalapiedra. As one of the top three contestants of the edition, Carrasco bid to represent Spain in the Eurovision Song Contest 2002, but the chance to represent Spain was won by Beth.

Recording career 
His first album, Quiéreme was released a month after the show's end in 2003. The album was produced by Miguel A. "Capi" Arenas and included four songs written by Carrasco himself. His first album sold more than 200,000 copies. The Quiéreme concert tour performed in 39 cities throughout Spain.

While recording his second album, Carrasco was offered the chance to participate in the Latin American music festival, "II Festival Mundial de Canción," in Puerto Rico. After competing against 22 singers from countries around the world, Carrasco won the competition with his self-composed song titled "Dibujar Tu Olvido.”

In October 2004, he released his second album, Manuel Carrasco. It was produced by Jordi Armengol, Jordi Cristau and Carrasco himself. All of the 13 songs (lyrics and music) were composed by Carrasco. He sold more than 100,000 albums and performed in 80 cities in the tour for his second album, including Ceuta, the Balearic Islands and the Canary Islands. Throughout the tour, Carrasco was accompanied on stage by renowned musicians, including Jordi Armengol (electric guitar and artistic direction), Jordi Cristau (keyboards), Jordi Portaz (bass), Eduardo Cortés (Spanish guitar), Carlos Martín (percussion) and David Simó (drums).

After spending more than a year recording in studios in the United States (New York City) and Spain (Girona), Manuel Carrasco released his third album, Tercera Parada, on September 5, 2006, with 13 self-composed songs plus an added bonus track. His first single from the album was titled "Y Ahora."

Carrasco's self-composed song, "El Beso de la Vida," was the theme song for the Venezuelan telenovela Ser Bonita No Basta.

In February 2005, Manuel Carrasco won the "Premio Dial" prize and went on to win the "Premio Musical 2005" for best new artist. He most recently received the "Premio Cadena Dial 2006" prize on February 28, 2007.

On September 16, 2008, Manuel Carrasco released his fourth studio album, Inercia. It was recorded in Buenos Aires, Argentina, and produced by Cachorro López. To promote the album, Carrasco will perform in theatres and auditoriums throughout Spain from January to March 2009. The official Inercia concert tour began in April 2009. Inercia entered the Spanish charts ("Lista 40 Principales") in its first week at number 34. As of November 29, 2008, the first single from the CD, "Sigueme," was at number 27 on the Spanish charts. The second single from the album was "Antes De Ti". The third single from the album "Que Nadie", a duet of Carrasco with Malú, became an unexpected hit that was awarded a Platinum Record certification and stayed at number one on the Spanish Singles Chart for seven weeks.

Carrasco's fifth album Habla was recorded in Milan, produced by Claudio Guidetti. It was published in January 2012 and peaked at number one in the Spanish Albums Chart; it was awarded a Platinum Record certification. The album was re-issued eleventh months after as Habla II with six new tracks. In 2013, the compilation album Confieso que he sentido was released to celebrate Carrasco's ten anniversary as a recording artist.

Discography
Studio albums
 Quiéreme (2003)
 Manuel Carrasco (2004)
 Tercera Parada (2006)
 Inercia (2008)
 Habla (2012) No. 1 Spain
 Confieso que he sentido (2013) No. 1 Spain, Platinum
 Bailar el viento (2015) No. 1 Spain
 La cruz del mapa (2018) No. 1 Spain
 Salida De Emergencia (2021) No. 3 Spain
 Corazon y Flecha (2022) No.1 Spain, Platinum

Extended play
 Quiéreme (2003)

References

External links
 Manuel Carrasco Official Website

1981 births
Living people
People from the Province of Huelva
Spanish pop singers
Star Academy participants
Singers from Andalusia
Latin pop singers
Operación Triunfo contestants
21st-century Spanish singers
21st-century Spanish male singers